Amy Clarke (1892–1980), is a British mystical poet and writer.

Amy Clarke or Amy Clark may also refer to:

 Amy Clarke (historical fiction writer) (Amy Clarke, 1853–1908), English writer
 Amy Clarke (musician) (born 1976), American singer-songwriter, musician and activist
Amy Ashmore Clark, Canadian-born American songwriter, composer, and businesswoman